This is a list of articles about the Blue Mountains in New South Wales, Australia.

A
 Aboriginal sites of New South Wales (includes Blue Mountains)

B
 Bargo River
 Barrallier, Francis
 Bell railway station, New South Wales
 Bell, New South Wales
 Bells Line of Road
 Berambing, New South Wales
 Bilpin, New South Wales
 Blackheath railway station, New South Wales
 Blackheath, New South Wales
 Blaxland railway station
 Blaxland, Gregory
 Blaxland, New South Wales
 Blue Gum Forest
 Blue Mountains Botanic Garden
 Blue Mountains Conservation Society
 Blue Mountains Dams
 Blue Mountains electoral district
 Blue Mountains Family History Society Inc
 Blue Mountains National Park
 Blue Mountains (New South Wales)
 Blue Mountains railway line
 Blue Mountains tree frog
 Bruce's Walk
 Bullaburra railway station
 Bullaburra, New South Wales
 Burra-Moko Head Sandstone

C
 Caley, George
 Capertee River
 Cascade Dams
 Colo River
 City of Blue Mountains
 Clarence, New South Wales
 Clarence Tunnel
 Cox, William
 Coxs River

D
 Darug

E
 Echo Point (lookout)
 Evans, George
 Evans Lookout
 Everglades Gardens
 Explorers tree

F
 Faulconbridge railway station
 Faulconbridge, New South Wales

G
 Gandangara
 Gardens of Stone National Park
 Glenbrook, New South Wales
 Glenbrook rail accident
 Glenbrook railway station
 Glenbrook Tunnel (1892)
 Glenbrook Tunnel (1913)
 Glen Davis, New South Wales
 Glen Davis Shale Oil Works
 Govetts Leap Falls
 Greater Blue Mountains Area
 Greaves Creek Dam
 Grose River
 Grose Valley

H
 Hartley, New South Wales
 Hartley Vale, New South Wales
 Hawkesbury Heights, New South Wales
 Hawkesbury River
 Hazelbrook railway station
 Hazelbrook, New South Wales
 Hollanders River
 Hydro Majestic Hotel

J
 Jamison Valley
 Jenolan Caves
 Jenolan Caves Road
 Jenolan River
 Jooriland River

K
 Kanangra-Boyd National Park
 Kanangra Creek
 Katoomba Cascade
 Katoomba Falls
 Katoomba railway station 
 Katoomba, New South Wales
 Katoomba to Mittagong Trail
 Kedumba River
 Kedumba Valley
 Kings Tableland
 Kowmung River
 Knapsack Viaduct
 Kurrajong, New South Wales
 Kurrajong Heights, New South Wales

L
 Lake Burragorang
 Lake Medlow
 Lapstone railway station
 Lapstone, New South Wales
 Lawson, William
 Lawson railway station
 Lawson, New South Wales
 Lennox Bridge, Glenbrook
 Leura railway station
 Leura, New South Wales
 Leuralla
 Lilianfels, Katoomba
 Linden railway station
 Linden, New South Wales
 List of mountain peaks of the Blue Mountains (New South Wales)
 Lithgow Blast Furnace
 Lithgow railway station
 Lithgow Small Arms Factory
 Lithgow Zig Zag
 Lithgow, New South Wales
 Little Hartley, New South Wales
 Little River (Oberon)
 Little River (Wollondilly)
 Locomotive Depot Heritage Museum

M
 Macdonald River
 Medlow Bath railway station
 Medlow Bath, New South Wales
 Medlow Dam
 Megalong Valley
 Michael Eades Reserve
 Mount Banks
 Mount Bindo
 Mount Boyce
 Mount Hay, New South Wales
 Mount Irvine
 Mount Piddington
 Mount Riverview, New South Wales
 Mount Solitary
 Mount Trickett (New South Wales)
 Mount Victoria railway station 
 Mount Victoria, New South Wales
 Mount Wilson, New South Wales
 Mount York
 Mountains Christian Academy

N
 Narrow Neck Plateau
 Nattai National Park
 Nattai River
 Nepean River
 Newnes, New South Wales
 Newnes Glow Worm Tunnel
 Norman Lindsay Gallery and Museum (in Blue Mountains)

P
 Parkes, Henry (lived in Blue Mountains)
 Perrys Lookdown
 Prime Ministers' Corridor of Oaks

R
 Ruined Castle

S
 Scenic World
 Shipley Plateau
 Six Foot Track
 Springwood, New South Wales
 Springwood High School
 Springwood railway station

T
 The Blue Mountains (Elgar)
 Thirlmere Lakes National Park
 Three Sisters
 Tonalli River

V
 Valley Heights Locomotive Depot Heritage Museum
 Valley Heights railway station
 Valley Heights Steam Tram Rolling Stock
 Valley Heights, New South Wales

W
 Warrimoo railway station
 Warrimoo, New South Wales
 Wentworth, William Charles
 Wentworth Falls (waterfall)
 Wentworth Falls railway station
 Wentworth Falls, New South Wales
 Wingecarribee River
 Winmalee, New South Wales
 Winmalee High School
 Wolgan River
 Wolgan Valley
 Wollemi National Park
 Wollondilly River
 Woodford Creek Dam
 Woodford railway station
 Woodford, New South Wales

Y
 Yellow Rock
 Yengo National Park
 Yerranderie, New South Wales

Z
 Zig Zag Railway

External links

Blue Mountains